Ana Maria Duran Calisto is an Ecuadorean architect, urbanist, and environmental planner who founded Estudio A0 with her husband and partner the architect Jaskran "Jazz" Kalirai in Quito, Ecuador.

Beyond architectural design, Duran Calisto is interested in  Native American cultures, climate justice, and sustainability with a focus on the history and urbanization of Amazonia as well as Amazonian communes. Her professional career expands beyond residential projects and architectural competitions and rather questions the status quo and challenges the spatial and environmental paradigm for urbanization in South American cities.

Early life and education 
Born at the skirts of an Andean volcano, Duran Calisto grew up in a city that shaped her early experience and knowledge of architecture, the landscape, and her culture. In early 1990, Duran Calisto attended the Liceo Scientifico Majorana as an exchange high school student in Turin, Italy. Prior to attending college, Duran Calisto desired to pursue a bachelor's degree in architecture; however, there was only one available program in Quito at the time, in a public university where attendance was being affected by political instability. Duran Calisto decided to join USFQ, a new private school at the time, which introduced a flexible credit system and curricular flexibility. After completing two years in the Applied Sciences program, she sought the opportunity to create her own degree plan to study liberal arts. Carlos Montufar, vice-chancellor and co-founder of the university, supported her initiative. She presented her proposal to her university's Academic Advisory Committee for approval. In 1995, she graduated with a Bachelor of Arts in Anthropology from the School of Liberal Arts at the Universidad San Francisco de Quito (USFQ) in Quito, Ecuador. Today, the Liberal Arts degree is the top program at USFQ and she was the first to graduate from such program. Moreover, during her undergraduate studies, Duran Calisto also studied abroad at the University of Illinois at Urbana-Champaign where she enrolled in anthropology classes with a focus on the Amazonian and Andean regions taught by professors like Norman E. Whitten Jr. Before returning to Ecuador, Duran Calisto was awarded the "Best International Student Award" granted by the University of Illinois to the international student with the highest grades. As an undergraduate, she also completed three minors: in Art History, Performing Arts, and Comparative Literature.

Professors Diego Quiroga, an anthropologist; Trinidad Perez, and art historian; Ivan Ulchur, a semiologist; Roberto Carbo, a theatre director; and her mentor, Carlos Montufar, a nuclear physicist, have been a long-lasting influence in Duran Calisto's career. By 2000, Duran Calisto attended the University of Pennsylvania Stuart Weitzman School of Design (then GSFA) and earned a master's degree in Architecture and a certificate in Historic Preservation. The mentor who influenced her vision and later architectural career the most at PennDesign was the Dutch-American professor, Winka Dubbeldam. Winka taught Duran Calisto to interpret architecture as a woven fabric— an interlaced system in which joints -whether static or dynamic- define the logic of assembly for the whole spatial fabric. Duran Calisto, now describes her professional work as a hybrid of stereotomy and tectonics, high- and low-tech, "nature" and "culture".

Upon returning to Ecuador, since 2002, Duran Calisto has been a professor in the practice of Architecture at the College of Architecture, Art, and Design (Facultad de Arquitectura, Diseño y Arte, FADA) at the Pontificia Universidad Católica del Ecuador. In addition, while in Ecuador, Duran Calisto continued to investigate spatial conditions in Amazonia as her self-induced research and true passion. She has also been a visiting scholar at Harvard University, the University of Michigan, and Columbia University. In 2011, Duran Calisto was awarded the Loeb Fellowship from the Graduate School of Design at Harvard University to develop the research network, South America Project, in close collaboration with professor Felipe Correa. Her research was initially inspired after Duran Calisto visited the city of Manaus in the 80s. Ever since, she became interested in urban Amazonia. After undertaking several Amazonian design studios and in the face of IIRSA/COSIPLAN, she organized an expedition along the Napo and Amazon rivers in the year 2008, concerned with the impact that integration infrastructures, particularly highways, would have on the basin. The journey from Quito to Belem do Para was a life-changing experience. Floating along the river, she conceived the idea of weaving an open and collaborative research network of South American scholars and interested partners abroad. Due to the complexity of the Amazonia, in 2015, Duran Calisto decided to pursue a doctoral degree from the Urban Planning program in the Luskin School of Public Affairs at UCLA. Under the advice of professor Susanna Hecht, Duran Calisto  is investigating the history of urbanization in Amazonia and the persistence of the indigenous commune amidst extractive pressures. Duran Calisto has also achieved an Urban Humanities Initiative Certificate and a Certificate in Global Public Affairs during her time at the University of California at Los Angeles. As of 2020, Duran Calisto serves as a visiting faculty at Yale Architecture conducting research seminars called "Sustainability: A Critical View from the Urban History of Amazonia" and "Territorial Cities of pre-colonial America."

During her PhD studies and research, Duran Calisto has proposed the creation of an Urban Amazonia Collective (UAC) in Quito, Ecuador. The main goal of the collective would be to engage and support Amazonian municipalities in the planning of urban ecologies that -like in ancestral times- conceive the city in its territorial dimension as intertwined forest, chakra (polyculture or agro-ecology), and settlement. The collective would also support urban and peri-urban indigenous communes pursuing forest remediation and sustainable forest-based economies. If successful, these projects would demonstrate -as they are doing elsewhere and have done in the past- that economic development and sustainability can coexist, and that there are alternatives to export-driven resource extraction (fossil-fuels, minerals, mono-cultures) with its concomitant negative environmental and social externalities (including urbanism as an externality of displacement). Simultaneously, the Collective would expose design professionals, students, and the general public to the renewable material resources of Amazonia; to the "water-born design epistemes" of the region (floating, hanging, and  "tiptoeing" models), and to Native America's territorial ontology of the "urban." The ultimate purpose of the Collective would be to provide resource-conscious environmental planning and design inspired in the ancestral cultures of the continent.

International career 
In addition to curating and organizing multiple international seminars and design-research workshops, Duran Calisto has co-edited the books Beyond Petropolis: Designing a Practical Utopia in Nueva Loja (ORO Publishers, 2015), with Michael Sorkin and Matthias Altwicker; and Urbanismo Ecológico en América Latina (Editorial GG - Harvard GSD, 2019), with Mohsen Mostafavi, Gareth Doherty, Marina Correia and Luis Valenzuela. She authored the poetry book Cuerpojo Azul (Ediciones de la Línea Imaginaria, 2010). Her articles and essays have been published in several magazines (Harvard Design Magazine, E-Flux Architecture, Arquine, Rita, Revista TRAMA, Revista Clave, 30 60 Cuaderno Latinoamericano de Arquitectura, CITE magazine, Revista RADAR, Revista PLOT, Ness Magazine, GAM, Aula Magazine, Arch Daily, Deco Journal, etc.) and books: Sorkin and Madaleno's Why Yachay? (UR, forthcoming), Correa's A Line in the Andes (Harvard GSD, 2014), Mehrotra and Muñoz-Sanz´ Extreme Urbanism 1: Reimagining Mumbai´s Back Bay (Harvard GSD, 2011), Torre's Beyond the Supersquare: Art & Architecture in Latin America After Modernism (Oxford University Press, 2014), and Correa and Busquet's Restructuring from within: a flatbed site in Quito as an agent for new centrality (Harvard GSD, 2007). Duran Calisto is an active member of the American Planning Association (APA), a registered architect in Ecuador, a member of the Latin American Studies Association (LASA), a member of the International Planning History Society (IPHS), and a member of the Council for Women in History.
Her architecture firm, Estudio A0, founded in 2002, focuses its efforts on developing ecologically minded projects, whether public, private or communal, in close collaboration with its clients. Estudio A0's projects aim to recycle construction materials as well as to develop in situ clean energy production, water harvesting and reuse, high- and low-tech hybrids, and to reactivate the local ecologies. The works and research of Estudio A0 have been featured in magazines and books from the Americas, Europe, and Asia, such as Office Design (Booq Publishing, 2019), Company Gardens: Green Spaces for Retreat and Inspiration (Braun Publishing, 2019), International Houses (Taschen, 2018), Thinking Practice: Reflections on Architectural Research and Building Work (Blackdog Publishing, 2007). The work has been showcased in venues such as the XX Architecture and Urbanism Biennial in Chile "Diálogos Impostergables," and the Oslo Architecture Triennial "Overgrowth." The team has won national and international competitions, and some of its projects have received awards within and beyond Ecuador. Duran Calisto has been juror in international curated awards like the Premio Rogelio Salmona and a member of the scientific committee in conferences such as the Temuco SBE19: "Sustainable Built- Urban Planning, Global Problems, and Local Policies.". Between 2005 and 2007, she was the Executive Secretary and curator for the XV Quito Architecture Biennial: Visible Cities. In 2015, she was hired by the Ecuadorian Ministry of Urban Development and Housing as academic advisor on the development of national contents for the UN Conference Habitat III (Quito, 2016). Between 2013 and 2014, Duran Calisto was the National Curator for the IX Iberian-American Architecture and Urbanism Biennial, curated by Ginés Garrido. In 2019, Harvard University's Graduate School of Design and Editorial Gustavo Gili published "Urbanismo ecológico en América Latina," a  project she collaborated on with Mohsen Mostafavi, Gareth Doherty, Marina Correia and Giannina Braschi.

Estudio A0 major works 

Casa Ortega - Sangolqui, Ecuador, 2017
 Universidad Regional de la Región Amazónica IKIAM / Ecuador- First place, National Design Competition, in collaboration with Del Hierro AU and L + A Arquitectos; 2013–2014; Ikiam University's Campus design was the recipient of the Sustainable Development Solutions Network (SDSN) Amazonia Infrastructure Award at COP 21 in Paris, 2015
 Quito Publishing House - First LEED Gold in continental Ecuador
 Museo Estuardo Maldonado (MEM) - Museum Renovation, Ecuador, 2013

References 

Ecuadorian women architects
Ecuadorian architects
University of California, Los Angeles alumni
Year of birth missing (living people)
Living people
21st-century Ecuadorian women